Eukaryotic translation initiation factor 3 subunit K (eIF3k) is a protein that in humans is encoded by the EIF3K gene.

Function 

The ~800 kDa eukaryotic initiation factor 3 (eIF3) is the largest eIF and contains at least 12 subunits, including eIF3k/EIF2S12. eIF3 plays an essential role in translation by binding directly to the 40S ribosomal subunit and promoting formation of the 43S preinitiation complex.

Interactions 

eIF3k has been shown to interact with Cyclin D3 and eIF3a.

See also 
Eukaryotic initiation factor 3 (eIF3)

References

Further reading

External links